The 1990 Mr. Olympia contest was an IFBB professional bodybuilding competition held on September 15, 1990, at the Arie Crown Theater in Chicago, Illinois.

Results

The total prize money awarded reached $200,000 for the first time ever.

Notable events

Lee Haney won his seventh consecutive Mr. Olympia title
 This was the first edition of Mr. Olympia to employ drug tests. Amid criticism by spectators for lowering the quality of the event, the IFBB reversed its decision the following year.
 World Wrestling Federation (WWF) owner Vince McMahon and bodybuilder Tom Platz bought a booth at the competition as representatives of a new magazine known as Bodybuilding Lifestyles. However, when Platz appeared on-stage as its representative during the closing ceremonies, he announced the formation of the World Bodybuilding Federation—a short-lived competitor to the IFBB backed by WWF parent company Titan Sports.

References

External links 
 Mr. Olympia
 1990 Mr. Olympia Top 6 Posedown (video)

 1990
1990 in American sports
1990 in bodybuilding